is a Japanese musician, songwriter and record producer. He is best known as the guitarist and main composer of the rock duo B'z, the best-selling music act in their native Japan. He also has a successful solo career where, in addition to winning several Japan Gold Disc Awards, he won the Grammy Award for Best Pop Instrumental Album for Take Your Pick (2010), which he made in collaboration with Larry Carlton. Matsumoto is only the fifth guitarist in the world to have his own Gibson signature model guitar.

Career
Matsumoto was inspired to pick up a guitar at the age of 13 when he heard Eric Clapton's playing on The Beatles song "While My Guitar Gently Weeps" for the first time. Reportedly he bought his first electric guitar at age of 15, a Japanese Gibson Les Paul after hearing Deep Purple's guitarist Ritchie Blackmore play "Smoke on the Water on live album Made in Japan. Matsumoto has said over the years that he has many favorite artists, from whom he has drawn much inspiration, from hard rock particularly such as Deep Purple, Led Zeppelin, Aerosmith and Van Halen and Michael Schenker. He has also cited a love of classical music, which was the catalyst for the incorporation of strings into many B'z compositions. He has also worked with Tokyo Ska Paradise Orchestra for many years, and their work often appears on many of the earlier B'z albums.

Matsumoto's attended jazz school, but when he started working as a session musician, and supporting tours like TM Network, his musicianship was cemented. His exposure to a myriad of styles helped him to meld his own unique blend, incorporating elements of his jazz training, blues (his incorporation of the style known as "Kansai Blues" is well known), classical, heavy metal, rock, and ska. Matsumoto's continued his session work throughout the early and mid-1980s with acts such as Mari Hamada until deciding to jump on the emerging solo instrumental trend catching on in Japan at that time. He recorded solo album Thousand Wave and worked with future globe headliner Tetsuya Komuro as a touring guitarist for Komuro's band TM Network. "99", a simple instrumental incorporating some blistering fretwork, is considered one of his finest works.

After his solo album, Matsumoto decided to try his hand at starting his own band. With his session work behind him, and a burgeoning production career, he started to search for a singer. After being presented with a tape from an unknown session singer known as Koshi Inaba, Matsumoto was blown away. Their first recorded session was a rendition of "Let It Be" and "Oh! Darling" by The Beatles, and even though the amp blew out, Matsumoto knew he had his new singer. Matsumoto and Koshi formed the duo B'z and debuted in September 1988. B'z has continued to be one of the most successful bands in the history of Japanese music, helped by the pairing of two very different musical directions. Matsumoto always drew his tastes from blues, classical, and jazz, while Koshi preferred rock music. Tak has ongoing friendships with musicians such as Barry Sparks, Marty Friedman, Billy Sheehan, Eddie Van Halen, Eric Martin, Jack Blades, Joe Perry, Pat Torpey, Steven Tyler, and Steve Vai, with whom Tak and Koshi recorded the song "Asian Sky" from the 1999 album, The Ultra Zone. Billy Sheehan recorded tracks for 1999's Brotherhood album, as well as touring (along with Shane Gaalaas) as support musicians for 2002's Green Live-Gym Tour. In 2002, Matsumoto contributed music to two songs ("Don't Stop Music!" and "Koiuta") in Misia's fourth album, Kiss in the Sky. She invited him to be a part of the album after discovering his solo work.

Matsumoto's 2003 solo album The Hit Parade was chosen as one of the Best Rock & Pop albums of the year at the 18th Japan Gold Disc Awards. In 2004, he formed the "Tak Matsumoto Group" with Eric Martin on vocal, Jack Blades on bass, and Brian Tichy on drums, forging ahead with his own brand of musical genius. Tak played guitar, produced the album and wrote songs while Eric and Jack wrote lyrics. On March, the single "Oh Japan ~Our Time Is Now~", was released. The album TMG I that made Tak go back and forth to US for the recording, was released on June 23. Tak has had this project idea for a long time; the album mixes rock and oriental sounds. The album topped the chart in the first week. Matsumoto energetically kept working. On July 18, 19 and 20, he had a collaboration concert with Tokyo Symphony Orchestra at Suntory Hall. At this special concert named Tokyo Special Collaboration 2004 Matsumoto Takahiro -HANA-, Tak played B'z hit "Love Phantom" and the solo number "HANA" with only his guitar and Orchestra. Soon after, TMG started its tour rehearsal. From July 30, the "Dodge The Bullet" tour started at Zepp Fukuoka. Chris Frazier who played songs on the B'z album Big Machine joined as the drummer for this tour. TMG had 16 shows in 8 locations including the last show at Nihon Budokan. In November, Matsumoto established his own label "House of Strings" which emphasizes guitarists and string musicians. He recorded again at a studio the songs played with the orchestra in July, and released it as the first House of Strings CD with the same title on the album. It is an instrumental album including Christmas numbers such as "Itsukano Merry Christmas" and "Holy Night". 

In 2005, he scored the soundtrack for the film Ultraman: The Next, while the next year wrote the music of "Real Face" for KAT-TUN. According to Oricon, "Real Face" became the Japanese best-selling single in 2006. In 2010, after the tour "Ain't No Magic" with B'z, Matsumoto worked with guitarist Larry Carlton. Together they released an album titled Take Your Pick in June 2010, available in Japan and around the world. The album was considered for nomination for nine categories of the 2011 Grammy Awards, and ended up winning the award for Best Pop Instrumental Album. It also won Jazz Album of the Year at the 25th Japan Gold Disc Awards. Together they embarked on a nationwide tour to support the album, with Matsumoto saying that "felt a little nervous playing "Room 335" with Mr. Larry Carlton every night". In 2016, Matsumoto released a three-track EP called Enigma, followed in 2017 by a collaboration album between himself and Hawaiian artist Daniel Ho, Electric Island, Acoustic Sea.

Matsumoto's albums Strings of My Soul (2012) and New Horizon (2014) each won the Japan Gold Disc Award for Instrumental Album of the Year. He won the award a third time for 2020's Bluesman.

Legacy
Matsumoto through his B'z fame is credited for the "resurrection and reinvention of the Japanese guitar hero", alongside and in comparison to X Japan guitarist hide, as a model of guitarist more interested in technique, technology and equipment, popularizing the electric guitar as a mass media product in Japan. Terry Burrows considered him the "most highly regarded guitarist to emerge from Asia". Matsumoto ranked first in a 2011 poll conducted by Japanese search engine goo on who the Japanese people thought was the best guitarist to represent Japan. In 2019, Matsumoto's song  was named the 51st best guitar instrumental by Young Guitar Magazine in 2019. In April 2022, the Japanese government awarded Matsumoto the Medal with Dark Blue Ribbon for his charitable contributions.

Musical equipment
Matsumoto was given his own Signature Model Les Paul from Gibson in 1999. Matsumoto was added to the Gibson signature artist club as the first guitarist from Asia. He currently holds the record with 7 different signature models produced, including "Model Double Cutaway". His Les Paul model was also adapted into an Epiphone. In recent years was released signature model "Doublecut Custom Ebony".

Early career
'Tak' Matsumoto Yamaha MGM Signature Model (1988–1989)
'Tak' Matsumoto Yamaha MGM-II Signature Model (1990–1992)
'Tak' Matsumoto Yamaha MGM-III Signature Model (1993–1995)
 Gibson Les Paul Standard Gold Top (1991–1998)
Music Man EVH Signature Model (1995–1998)
(Mesa Boogie) Mark III head amp (1985–1991)
 VHT 100 watt rack-mounted heads (1985–1991)
(Mesa Boogie) 2 channel Dual Rectifier 100 watt (1992–1995)
(Mesa Boogie) 4 X 12 celestion speaker (Rebadged to a Ferrari emblem)
Rockman XPR (1988–1997)
Marshall JCM 800 100 watt heads (1994)
Marshall 4x12's with Celestion speakers (Rebadged "Matsumoto") (1992–1997)
Peavey 5150 guitar amp (1996–2000)
Peavey 5150II 100 watt amplifier (2000–2002)
EMB Audio Remote wah system

2002-present 
Gibson 'Tak' Matsumoto Signature Model (4 types)
2 ESP Custom Shop Craft House Eclipses (blue burst floyd, amber burst)
Bogner Ecstasy Classic 100 watt Amplifiers
 Bogner Uberschall 100 Watt Amplifiers
Bogner "Rei" 4x12 cabinets (with specially voiced custom speakers)
Budda Budwah
Digitech Whammy Pedal
Taurus Distortion Pedal
Dunlop 1.00 Guitar Picks
Sadowsky Tokyo Stratocaster Type (2006, from the Monster's Garage)
Matsumoto has also amassed a substantial guitar collection, including the following:

1870 Martin C-7 Acoustic Guitar
1937 Martin 000-18 Acoustic Guitar
1952 Fender Telecaster (Butterscotch Blonde)
1954 Fender Stratocaster (Tobacco Sunburst)
1956 Gibson Les Paul Goldtop (with 'Soapbar' pickups)
1959 Gibson Les Paul Flametop (with PAF pickups)
1962 Fender Stratocaster (Fiesta Red)
1962 Gibson SG

Matsumoto is also an avid collector of older guitar amplifiers, as well as an accomplished bass player. Aside from guitars, he also owns other instruments, such as a few sitars, electric and otherwise.

Discography

With B'z

Solo works

Albums 
Thousand Wave (May 21, 1988), Oricon ranking: No. 58
Wanna Go Home (April 22, 1992) No. 3
Rock'n Roll Standard Club (May 15, 1996) No. 2
Thousand Wave Plus (October 7, 1996) No. 25
Knockin' "T" Around (April 14, 1999) No. 5
 (February 27, 2002) No. 5
 (February 27, 2002) No. 4
The Hit Parade (November 26, 2003) No. 2
House of Strings (November 24, 2004) No. 7
Theatre of Strings (October 19, 2005) No. 9
Take Your Pick (June 2, 2010) No. 2
Strings of My Soul (June 20, 2012) No. 4
New Horizon (April 20, 2014) No. 3
enigma (April 6, 2016) No. 4
Electric Island, Acoustic Sea (February 8, 2017) No. 7
Bluesman (September 2, 2020) No. 3

Singles 
'88 ~ Love Story/Love Ya (September 25, 1991) Oricon ranking: No. 8
#1090 Thousand Dreams (March 18, 1992) – Music Station opening theme - No. 3
The Changing (March 25, 1999) No. 3
異邦人 (Ihoujin) (August 27, 2003), features Zard and Matsuda Akiko of Ramjet Pulley, No. 2
イミテイション・ゴールド [Imitation Gold] (October 8, 2003), features Mai Kuraki and Nakamura Yuri of GARNET CROW, No. 1

TMG (Tak Matsumoto Group)

Albums 
TMG I (June 23, 2004) No. 1

Singles 
"Oh Japan ~Our Time Is Now~" (March 31, 2004) No. 3

Video 
Dodge The Bullet (December 15, 2004) No. 8

References

External links
B'z official website – also includes Tak's substantial guitar collection
House of Strings – His instrumental collaborative solo project

1961 births
B'z
Lead guitarists
Living people
People from Toyonaka, Osaka
20th-century Japanese guitarists
21st-century Japanese guitarists
Japanese male singer-songwriters
Japanese record producers
Japanese rock guitarists
Japanese male rock singers
Japanese male pop singers
Japanese session musicians
Being Inc. artists
Grammy Award winners
Musicians from Osaka Prefecture
Tak Matsumoto Group members
Recipients of the Medal of Honor (Japan)